Emmanuel Humphrey Tettey Korboe was a Ghanaian politician in the first republic. He served as a regional commissioner for the Eastern Region and later for the Central Region. He also served as a member of parliament for the Yilo-Krobo constituency and later the Somanya constituency.

Early life and education
Korboe was born in 1912.
He had his early education at Accra Royal School and continued at the O'Reilley Educational Institute.

Career and politics
Korboe begun as a clerk to the Abdala Transport Company in 1932. He later became a farmer and a cocoa broker.
He was chairman of the Yilo Krobo Local Council, chairman of the Somanya branch of the Convention People's Party (CPP) and chairman of the Volta River District CPP Constituency Council. In 1954 he was elected to represent the Yilo Krobo constituency in the National Assembly. He was appointed Regional Commissioner (Regional Minister) for the Eastern Region in 1957. He held this political position from 1957 to 1965. In 1965 he was appointed Regional Commissioner for the Central Region. He served in this capacity until February 1966 when the Nkrumah government was overthrown.

References

1912 births
Year of death missing
Date of death unknown
Ghanaian MPs 1954–1956
Ghanaian MPs 1956–1965
Ghanaian MPs 1965–1966
Convention People's Party (Ghana) politicians
20th-century Ghanaian politicians